George was a Swiss-Canadian television series which aired on CTV on Thursday evenings in 1972–73.

The series was based on the 1972 film George!, about the adventures of a St. Bernard dog and his owner who live in Switzerland. Marshall Thompson starred in both the film and the resulting half-hour series. The series made its CTV debut in a Thursday evening time slot on 16 September 1972. However, George ended in 1973 after its only season. The Globe and Mail's Blaik Kirby considered the program to be "abysmal". Despite its short run and mixed critical reaction, the series was rerun on CTV affiliates for years afterwards, usually to fill Saturday morning schedules.

Cast
 Marshall Thompson – Jim Hunter
 Trudy Young – Aunt Helga
 Erna Sellmer – Frau Gerber
 Jack Mullaney- Walter
 Volker Stewart – Freddie

Guest appearances
 Zsa Zsa Gabor
 Alan Hale Jr.
 Art Hindle
 John Banner

References

External links
 
 An episode of George

1972 Canadian television series debuts
1973 Canadian television series endings
1972 Swiss television series debuts
1973 Swiss television series endings
1974 German television series debuts
1974 German television series endings
CTV Television Network original programming
Television shows about dogs
German drama television series
Swiss drama television series
1970s Canadian drama television series
1970s German television series
1970s Swiss television series
Television shows set in Switzerland